45s or 45S may refer to:

 Silver Lake Forest Service Strip (FAA identifier: 45S), an airport in Lake County, Oregon, U.S.
 Forty-fives, a trick-taking card game
 45s: 45 rpm 7" vinyl single records spun at forty-five revolutions per minute (rpm or RPM); some Gramophone records also spun at 45 rpm.
 FourFiveSeconds, a song by Rihanna, Kanye West and Paul McCartney
 Soldiers in the Jacobite army of the Jacobite rising of 1745
 Sulfur-45 (45S), an isotope of sulfur

See also
S45 (disambiguation)